Horror High (also known as Twisted Brain and Kiss the Teacher...Goodbye!) is a 1973 American horror film directed by Larry N. Stouffer, written by J.D. Feigelson, and starting Pat Cardi, Austin Stoker, Rosie Holotik, John Niland, Joye Hash, Jeff Alexander and Mike McHenry. The plot follows the story of a shy, yet exceptionally smart biology student who uses a new physically body-altering drug he has invented to wreak havoc on those at his school who have wronged him.

Plot 
Vernon Potts is a shy, yet clever and friendly high school student who frequently experiences bullying and other cruel behaviour at the hands of the bullies and teachers at his school. Despite this, he develops a friendship with his classmate Robin Jones, much to the dissaproval of her boyfriend and high school jock, Roger Davis. 

Late one night after school, Vernon sneaks into the science classroom to feed the class guinea pig Mr. Mumps, whom he has also used as a test subject for a new drug he has created as part of his biology project. However, he discovers that the drug has turned Mr. Mumps into a small, snarling beast, which has killed a cat owned by the school's creepy old janitor, Mr. Griggs. Vernon tries to dispose of the cat's body, but Griggs catches him in the act, and, thinking Vernon responsible, beats him down in a fit of rage, before beating Mr. Mumps to death with a pestle. After eyeing a batch of the drug used on Mr. Mumps, Griggs threatens Vernon into drinking it. Upon doing so, Vernon starts rapidly convulsing, before becoming rabid and violent, following which he kills Mr. Griggs by dunking him into a barrel of sulphuric acid.

Despite Vernon's best efforts to dispose of the evidence, Griggs's dissolved remains are found during science class the next day. Lieutenant Bozeman is brought in to investigate, and briefly talks with Vernon to see if he knows anything, but Vernon keeps himself silent about the murder, and so, due to a lack of evidence, Bozeman leaves.

Following an English test, Vernon is called over by his wicked English teacher, Mrs. Grindstaff, who tells him that due to his struggling performance in English in comparison to his biology efforts, he will have to attend every literature club meeting for the rest of the semester in order for him to earn a credit high enough for him to be able to graduate. Despite Vernon's protests, since the club meetings coincide with his weekly library visits, Grindstaff ultimately gets him to do so above his wishes. Since the literature club is already happening that night, Vernon goes, but instead spends the meeting's duration in the science classroom, as he brews up another batch of the drug he used on Mr. Mumps and drinks it as the meeting comes to a close. Once everyone else has left, Vernon transforms, and after chasing and terrorizing Grindstaff, ultimately kills her by decapitating her with a paper guillotine.

Grindstaff's body is discovered the next morning, and Lieutenant Bozeman is once again brought in. Vernon, slowly losing his grip on sanity, admits to Robin that Mr. Mumps is dead, and tells her that he is giving up on the biology experiment. In exchange, Robin offers Vernon an opportunity to work on her biology project instead, which Vernon agrees to.

During a meeting with Coach McCall in the locker room, McCall reprimands Vernon for valuing chemistry and biology over P.E. and all his other subjects. However, he offers him an opportunity for him to be able to skip out on P.E. for the rest of year; since a student of his is struggling in chemistry and needs to pass all his subjects in order to be eligible for a football career, McCall offers Vernon the opportunity to help them out. Vernon goes along with it at first, but is dismayed to learn that the student is none other than his bully Roger, and that he will have to let Roger cheat the exam since it is tomorrow. In response, McCall tells Vernon to give him a call at 10:00pm that night after he has time to make considerations, but specifically tells him to keep their plan a secret.

That night, whilst waiting in the school for Vernon's response, McCall suddenly encounters Bozeman and his police squad, who quickly start to suspect him of the murders, but McCall is able to talk himself out of getting arrested. Soon after Bozeman leaves, McCall encounters Vernon, whom has already consumed another batch of the drug. Vernon kills McCall by lacerating his chest with track spikes, and his screams attract the attention of Bozeman's police squad, whom quickly find the body and arrest Roger after they find him wandering around outside the building.

The next morning, Robin expresses distress over Roger's arrest, but Vernon calms her down, and arranges a date with her at the park for 7:30 that night. That night, however, Vernon receives a call from Roger, who tells him that the police have released him due to a lack of evidence. Roger then tells Vernon that he saw Vernon sneaking into the chemistry lab the night of his arrest, and threatens to frame him unless he meets up with him at the school in an hour. Vernon reluctantly agrees.

Upon arriving at the school, Vernon brews yet another batch of the drug, and drinks it, only to be scared off by the sound of someone at the classroom window. Believing it to be Roger, Vernon flees, only to run into Robin, whom warns him about Roger since she thinks he plans to kill Vernon. However, Vernon then reveals that he was the murderer, and apologises to Robin, only to once again transform and chase her throughout the school. He eventually catches up to her, but rather than killing her, breaks down into tears. However, Bozeman and his police squad then show up and start firing at Vernon, who flees and jumps out the window. Outside, he encounters Roger, whom he starts beating to the ground, only for the police squad to show up and shoot Vernon to death. The movie ends with Robin mourning over Vernon's body.

Cast 

 Pat Cardi as Vernon Potts
 Austin Stoker as Lieutenant Bozeman
 Rosie Holotik as Robin Jones
 John Niland as Coach McCall
 Joye Hash as Mrs. Grindstaff
 Jeff Alexander as Mr. Griggs
 Mike McHenry as Roger Davis
 Nick Felix as Mr. Henshaw
 Michelle Falerne as Girl Student
The police officers seen during the film's climax are also played by members of the Dallas Cowboys football team, including Billy Truax, D.D. Lewis, Craig Morton and Calvin Hill, all of whom were brought in by Niland.

Production 

Screenwriter J.D. Feigelson says he got the idea for the movie after wondering what it would be like if Dr. Jekyll and Mr. Hyde were set in a high school. The film was shot over the course of two weeks in Irving, Texas.

Release 
The film was first released on 20 September 1973 in Irving, Texas, and was later given a wider release in the United States in March 1974. The film was originally rated X by the MPAA, and so, after it was sold to Crown International Pictures, the film's kill sequences were cut down to get a PG rating. Crown International's then-president Mark Tenser also had approximately 8 minutes of additional footage be shot to pad out the runtime and make up for the lost duration. This new footage had Tenser himself playing the role of Vernon's absent father, and features little, if any, connection to the rest of the film. The PG-cut of the film (retitled "Twisted Brain") was aired frequently on WPIX's "Chiller Theatre" series.

Home Media 
The film had its first DVD release in 2004 when Rhino Entertainment released it as part of the boxset Horrible Horrors Collection Vol 1, alongside The Hearse, Prime Evil, Terror, Lurkers, Fleshburn, Satan's Slave, and Point of Terror. However, this release was sourced from a low-quality VHS transfer of the Twisted Brain TV cut. The R-rated cut of the movie was restored and released for the first time on DVD by Code Red on August 10, 2010. The film was also released as part of Mill Creek Entertainment's 200 Film Set Drive-In Cult Classics Collection. On July 26, 2022, independent home video distributor Vinegar Syndrome released the film in its original and uncut form on Blu-ray for the first time in a combo-pack with the 1972 film Stanley. This release, sourced from "the only known and fully-uncut 16mm lab print", features exclusive interviews from screenwriter Fiegelson and actors Cardi, Niland and Falerne, as well as a commentary track featuring Cardi.

References

External Links 
 Horror High at IMDb
 Horror High at AllMovie
 Alternative opening to the film, under its "Twisted Brain" title
1973 horror films
1970s slasher films
Films about biology
Films about bullying
Films about teacher–student relationships
1973 independent films
Films about science
Films about students
American slasher films
Films set in schools
Films about murder
Films shot in Texas
Dr. Jekyll and Mr. Hyde films
Films about drugs
Films about potions